In the doubles competition of the 2012 St. Petersburg Open tennis tournament, Colin Fleming and Ross Hutchins were the defending champions, but lost in the quarterfinals to Martin Kližan and Filip Polášek.
In the final, first seeds Rajeev Ram and Nenad Zimonjić prevailed over the Slovak team of Lukáš Lacko and Igor Zelenay by the score of 6–2, 4–6, [10–6].

Seeds

Draw

Draw

References
 Main Draw

2012 Doubles
St. Petersburg Open - Doubles
2012 in Russian tennis